Zhoupu is a Shanghai Metro station located on Line 18 in the town of Zhoupu, within Pudong, Shanghai. Located at the intersection of Nianjiabang Road and Hunan Highway, the station opened for passenger service on 26 December 2020.

References 

Railway stations in Shanghai
Shanghai Metro stations in Pudong
Line 18, Shanghai Metro
Railway stations in China opened in 2020